Fishdom is a puzzle game developed by Playrix for Microsoft Windows, Mac OS, Nintendo DS, Nintendo DSi, Nintendo 3DS, Android, iOS, and iPadOS. The game was launched 18 June 2008.

Gameplay 

The object of the game is to solve puzzles and earn coins to set up and decorate a virtual aquarium. Using in-game currency the player is able to purchase different species of fish, decorations, and "comfort" items to make the environment more pleasant for pet fishes. Filling all of the three meter gauges measuring the progress will unlock one of the trophies: bronze, silver, or gold. Adorned and themed tanks can be used as a smartphone screensaver.

Levels are based on a standard for "match three" mechanics: the player swaps two adjacent gems to make matches of three or more.  Each of the rounds takes place on a different grid and poses a challenge earning every golden tile by matching gems over them at least once. Some of the tiles are locked and have a different color; to unlock them the player should match gems over a couple of times. When three or more objects are matched simultaneously, one of the bonuses appears: firecrackers, depth bombs, dynamite charges, or lightning. The puzzle board should be cleared before the player runs out of moves otherwise the player has to do the level again in order to progress to the next level. The platform also provides mini-games, holiday-themed upgrades, pearl tournament challenges, and 3D-simulation of a scuba mask which allows the user to dive into the deep sea. By 2019, Playrix changed the gaming concept to "freemium", in which various currencies such as diamonds can also be purchased in the app.

Reception 
The original game was released in 2008 for PC and was adapted for smartphones by 2015. In addition, several sequels have been launched.

Fishdom ranks among the most popular games from developer Playrix and received generally positive reviews. iParenting Media named Fishdom H2O: Hidden Odyssey one of the Greatest Video Games of 2009. According to the analytics of Sensor Tower, Fishdom was a top game in the category Puzzle&Decorate with around 15.6 million downloads in 2020. The game was ranked 16th on the annual App Store list of the best free games (8th for iPad, 19th for iPhone). According to Statista, the game was one of the ten most downloaded puzzle gaming apps as of 2021.

Negative reception 
Despite seemingly good reception at first, some believe the game to be pay-to-win, as it appears to them that the game has nearly impossible levels, which usually need the game's boosters to easily beat. Others also call out the game for false advertising, since the pin-pulling puzzles in the advertisements are rarely seen in-game. This portion of negative reception can also be applied to Playrix's other games, such as Homescapes and Gardenscapes: New Acres, some also applying it to the company itself.

References

External links 
 
 Overview of Fishdom in The Tech Journal

2008 video games
2020s fads and trends
Android (operating system) games
Casual games
Classic Mac OS games
Facebook games
Flash games
IOS games
Mobile games
Nintendo 3DS games
Nintendo DS games
Nintendo DSi games
Playrix games
Single-player video games
Tile-matching video games
Vertically-oriented video games
Video games developed in Russia
Video games with underwater settings
Windows games
Windows Phone games